Awheaturris quisquilia is an extinct species of sea snail, a marine gastropod mollusk in the family Raphitomidae.

Description

Distribution
Fossils of this marine species were found in Miocene strata in Central Chile.

References

 Philippi, Rodolfo Amando. Los fósiles terciarios i cuartarios de Chile. Del Gobierno de Chile, 1887.
 Philippi, R.A., 1887, Die tertiären und quartären Versteinerungen Chiles: F.A. Brockhaus, Leipzig, 266 p
 Shuto, T. (1992) Affinity of the Late Miocene turrid fauna of Chile. Reports of Andean Studies, Shizuhoka University,
Special Vol. 4, 21–31

External links
 Sven N. Nielsen (2003), Die marinen Gastropoden (exklusive Heterostropha) aus dem Miozän von Zentralchile; Universität Hamburg

quisquilia
Gastropods described in 1887